Old Leake was a railway station on the East Lincolnshire Railway which served the village of Old Leake in Lincolnshire between 1848 and 1964. It originally opened as Hob Hole and was renamed three times within the first five years of opening. Withdrawal of passenger services took place in 1956, followed by goods facilities in 1964. The line through the station remains in use as the Poacher Line.

History
The station was opened on 2 October 1848 as Hob Hole, but was renamed one month later as Leake and Wrangle. The name changed again less than one year later in October 1849 to Old Leake and Wrangle, before becoming simply Old Leake in October 1852. The village of Old Leake lay to the east of the line, whilst Wrangle is 1½ miles to the north-west. This section was the last to be completed in September 1848 at an agreed cost of  £123,000 (£ in ). At the time, Old Leake village consisted of little more than an inn and the station itself. The July 1922 timetable saw five up and four down services, and one Sunday service each way, call at Old Leake. The station was closed to passengers on 17 September 1956 and to goods traffic on 15 June 1964.

Present day

References

Sources

External links
 Old Leake station on navigable 1947 O. S. map
 Webpage including a picture of Old Leake station building

Disused railway stations in Lincolnshire
Railway stations in Great Britain closed in 1964
Railway stations in Great Britain opened in 1848
Former Great Northern Railway stations